Judy Obitre–Gama, also Judy Obitre Gama, is a Ugandan lawyer, academic and civil servant. She is the former executive director of the National Identification and Registration Authority in Uganda.

Background and education
Obitre–Gama holds a Bachelor of Laws from Makerere University, a Diploma in Legal Practice from the Law Development Centre and a Master of Laws from the University of London.

Career
She served as a lecturer in the Faculty of Law at Makerere University. Prior to that, she served as an environmental lawyer with the National Environment Management Authority of Uganda. For three years, ending December 2009, she served as the Head of Legal & Surveillance and Company Secretary at the Uganda Securities Exchange. Between July 2012 and June 2015, she served as the Board Secretary of Uganda Registration Services Bureau. She was sworn in as the new Executive Director of NIRA on 15 July 2015.

See also
 Uganda Registration Services Bureau

References

External links
Website of National Identification and Registration Authority

1970s births
Living people
21st-century Ugandan lawyers
Ugandan women lawyers
People from Maracha District
People from Northern Region, Uganda
Makerere University alumni
Law Development Centre alumni
Alumni of the University of London